Reeves Bluffs is a line of east-facing rock bluffs, 8 nautical miles (15 km) long, situated 15 nautical miles (28 km) west of Cape Murray in the Cook Mountains, Antarctica. Discovered by the Discovery expedition (1901–04) under Captain Robert F. Scott, who gave the name "Mount Reeves," after Edward A. Reeves, Map Curator to the Royal Geographical Society, to a summit along this bluff. The bluff was mapped in detail by United States Geological Survey (USGS) from surveys and U.S. Navy aerial photography (1959–63). Since a prominent mountain does not rise from the bluffs, and because the name Mount Reeves is in use elsewhere in Antarctica, the Advisory Committee on Antarctic Names (US-ACAN) (1965) recommended that the original name be amended and that the entire line of bluffs be designated as Reeves Bluffs.
 

Cliffs of Oates Land